The Broad Front, officially the Broad Political Electoral Front in Resistance (FAPER) and sometimes known by the abbreviation EL FRENTE, is a political party in Honduras. It was recognized by the Supreme Electoral Tribunal on 8 May 2012. Its presidential candidate in the 2013 elections was Andrés Pavón.

The party was disestablished on 13 May 2014, due to the poor results in the elections. It was re-established in 2016.

References

Political parties established in 2012
2012 establishments in Honduras

Political parties disestablished in 2014
Socialist parties in North America